WTNG-CD, virtual channel 7 (UHF digital channel 33), is a low-power, class A television station licensed to Lumberton and Pembroke, North Carolina, United States.

The station carries programming from Luken Communications as well as programming from LATV, First Nations Experience, QVC, HSN and Jewelry TV.

WTNG-CD is owned by Mercy's Bridge Media. The station was started by the Billy Ray Locklear Evangelistic Association and sold in 2015 to Dilicast Broadcast Services, which in turn sold the station to Mercy's Bridge in 2018.

Digital channels
The station's digital signal is multiplexed:

References

External links

Rabbitears.info query - WTNG-CD

Television stations in North Carolina
TNG
Television channels and stations established in 1990
Low-power television stations in the United States
First Nations Experience affiliates
LATV affiliates